Hyatt Regency Chennai is an 18-storey five-star luxury hotel located on Anna Salai at Teynampet in Chennai, India. Designed in 1986, the construction of the hotel started in the 1990s. However, the completion was delayed for nearly two decades and the hotel was opened on 10 August 2011 at a cost of 5.50 billion.

History

From a map of the city in 1942, the property can be traced back to a house called "Teynampet Villa", a government property allotted to P. S. Viswanatha Iyer, ICS, in the late 1940s. The area was then occupied by a bungalow named "Abbotsbury." In the 1950s, it was replaced by C. S. Loganatha Mudaliar with the city's first purpose-built community hall, which was later sold out to J. H. Tarapore. Soon the Tarapore property was given to the Sai Baba of Puttaparthi, who later sold it to Magunta Subbarami Reddy, the founder of the Balaji Group of Hotels. With the collaboration of the Oberoi Group of Hotels, Balaji Group of Hotels started building the structure in 1989 at a cost of 2.90 billion. However, after the murder of Magunta Subbarami Reddy, the group was caught in a financial crisis and the work on the project, initially named Magunta Oberoi, ceased in 2000 when about 75 percent of the work was complete. Consequently, the Oberois withdrew from the project the same year and it could not be completed in time. In 2006, the unfinished property was to be acquired by Lalit Suri, for 3.90 billion. However, after the death of Lalit Suri, Robust Hotels Private Limited, belonging to the Saraf Group, purchased the unfinished hotel development from IFCI and TFCI in mid-2007 and appointed Confluence, an international consultancy firm, to manage the completion of the project, which started remodelling the structure in 2008 and completed in February 2011. The retail space was bought from ICICI by Ramee Guestline Hotels. With the acquisition by the Saraf Group, the hotel was opened as Hyatt Regency Chennai on 8 August 2011.

The hotel
It also has a fitness centre; the Chic Lobby Lounge; Biscotti, the hotel's gourmet deli; Spice Haat, the 240-seat all-day-dining buffet restaurant; and Stix, serving authentic Chinese cuisine from the Sichuan region. Each of the five live kitchens specialises in a specific culinary genre within the Indian Comfort food landscape. The Lobby Lounge, the 24-hour lounge, is set amidst the indoor green landscaping under the hotel atrium. The hotel also has an outdoor pool, which overlooks the city, and is set amidst custom-made art installations and lush landscaping. Additional hotel services and amenities include Regency Club, the Siddh Spa, the hotel's premium suites, specialty restaurant and a bar. The hotel also houses one of the largest collections of publicly displayed art installations in the country created by more than 40 national and international artists.

The mall

The first three floors, including half the ground floor and the first floor and the whole of the second floor, of the hotel building has been developed as a boutique shopping mall named as the Ramee Mall developed by Ramani Hotels Ltd at a cost of 1.20 billion. The mall has 2 pairs of escalators and 4 passenger elevators, in addition to 2 separate service elevators for retail.

A third of the retail space has been leased out to Shoppers Stop and another  has been occupied by a book store. Apart from the large-format stores, there are about 30 vanilla stores (small shops each occupying less than ) and a  food court in the mall, in addition to a dining restaurant, a spa and a salon.

Events
The hotel was the venue for the World Chess Championship 2013, held for the first time in India, from 9 to 28 November 2013.

The hotel conducts events such as Style Bazaar Exhibition, a lifestyle exhibition of fashion, decor, jewellery, festive edits and accessories.

Awards
 In 2012, the hotel won the "Best International Hotel Marketing" award, by International Hotel Awards in London.
 In 2013, the hotel was awarded for the category New Hotel Construction and Design for India at Kuala Lumpur.

Gallery

See also

 List of hotels in Chennai
 List of tallest buildings in Chennai

References

External links

 Official website of Hyatt Regency Chennai
 Official website of Ramee Mall

Hotels in Chennai
Skyscraper hotels in Chennai
Hyatt Hotels and Resorts
Hotels established in 2011
Hotel buildings completed in 2011
2011 establishments in Tamil Nadu